Lai Shin-yuan (born 9 November 1956, in Taichung, Taiwan) is a Taiwanese politician who served as minister of the Mainland Affairs Council from 2008 to 2012.

Education
Lai earned an M.A. degree International Relations from the London School of Economics and Political Science. 
Lai earned an MPhil degree and a DPhil degree in Development Studies from the University of Sussex.

Academic career
She previously taught at Shih Hsin University (1997–98) and Tamkang University (1997–2008) as an adjunct professor.

Political career
Lai served as a senior adviser on the National Security Council in the Chen Shui-bian Administration from 2000 to 2004. From 2005 to 2008, Lai was a member of the Legislative Yuan, representing the Taiwan Solidarity Union.

ROC Mainland Affairs Council Ministry
Lai was selected to head the Mainland Affairs Council by President Ma Ying-jeou. She took office on 20 May 2008, with the Liu Chao-shiuan cabinet. During her term, Lai oversaw the normalization of relations between Taiwan and the special administrative regions of the PRC which are Hong Kong and Macau. Reciprocal offices were established in the three areas.

Taipei Economic and Cultural Office in Macau

On 19 July 2011, Lai officially unveiled the renaming of ROC representative office in Macau from Taipei Economic and Cultural Center in Macau to Taipei Economic and Cultural Office in Macau, bringing it in line with the rest of ROC representative offices around the world. The office renaming would give the ROC government better opportunities to promote Taiwan in Macau. The official renaming was made on 4 July 2011.

Taipei Economic and Cultural Office in Hong Kong

On 20 July 2011, Lai preceded the ceremony to rename the ROC representative office to Hong Kong from Chung Hwa Travel Service to Taipei Economic and Cultural Office in Hong Kong, bringing it inline with other ROC representative offices naming around the world. This renaming possibility was considered a milestone in the improved cross-strait relations between Taipei and Beijing. The office is located at Lippo Center building.

Macau Economic and Cultural Office in Taipei

On 13 May 2012, Lai celebrated the opening ceremony of Macau representation office in Taiwan. Lai was accompanied by Cheong U, Secretary for Social Affairs and Culture of the Macau SAR. Lai added that the office establishment resulted from the principle of goodwill and reciprocity held by both sides and it was considered a milestone in the development for bilateral relation between ROC and Macau. The office is located in Taipei 101 building.

Hong Kong Economic, Trade and Cultural Office in Taipei

On 15 May 2012, Lai oversaw the opening ceremony of the Hong Kong Economic, Trade and Cultural Office in Taipei. The office is located at President International Tower (統一國際大樓) building in Xinyi District. She added that bilateral relations between Taiwan and Hong Kong are close and hoped that the reciprocal office establishment between the two sides can serve as platform for interaction what will expand the promotion of interaction and cooperation. Also present during the opening ceremony was John Tsang, Financial Secretary of the Hong Kong SAR. He said during his opening note that Taiwan and Hong Kong have made substantial progress in the area of economic exchanges, cultural exchanges, financial supervision cooperation, bilateral transportation arrangement and cargo transshipment.

References

External links
Mainland Affairs Council, Minister profile

Living people
1956 births
Taiwan Solidarity Union Members of the Legislative Yuan
Politicians of the Republic of China on Taiwan from Taichung
Women government ministers of Taiwan
Members of the 6th Legislative Yuan
Party List Members of the Legislative Yuan
Academic staff of Tamkang University
Shih Hsin University alumni
Alumni of the London School of Economics
Alumni of the University of Sussex